Ayul Regai is a 2005 Indian Tamil film directed by K. G. Ashok starring Thennavan in his lead debut.

Cast
Thennavan as Karikalan
Shriji
 Gayatri 
Gurudutt as psychiatrist
 Isac as Shatru
Santhana Bharathi
Vishwa

Production
Ashok, an assistant director to Kamal Haasan for Virumaandi (2004), announced plans to make his debut through Aayul Regai. Pasupathy signed on to play the lead role but later opted against working on the film, prompting Thennavan to be signed on. The film was shot in Bangalore.

Release
In hsi review, film critic Balaji Balasubramaniam wrote "with a complex story, a complicated screenplay, unfamiliar actors and no masala elements like fights or comedy or item numbers, Aayul Regai is Tamil cinema at its riskiest!"

References

2005 films
2000s Tamil-language films